José Alvarado (born 20 August 1953) is a Salvadoran former swimmer. He competed in three events at the 1968 Summer Olympics.

References

External links
 

1953 births
Living people
Salvadoran male swimmers
Olympic swimmers of El Salvador
Swimmers at the 1968 Summer Olympics
Sportspeople from San Salvador
20th-century Salvadoran people
21st-century Salvadoran people